"Bleed It" is a song by American rapper Blueface. It was released as a single on January 11, 2019 and released to rhythmic radio on February 19, 2019. It is the lead single from his second extended play, Dirt Bag (2019). The music video, directed by Cole Bennett, was released prior in December 2018 on the Lyrical Lemonade YouTube channel. It reached number 46 on the US Billboard Hot R&B/Hip-Hop Songs chart after the success of his previous single "Thotiana".

Critical reception
Along with Blueface's other tracks "Thotiana" and "Next Big Thing", HotNewHipHop said that on "Bleed It", "it's clear that Blueface has a knack for stringing together some pretty funny yet lyrical bars". Trent Fitzgerald of XXL said the track features "gun-toting rhymes".

Music video
The music video for "Bleed It" was directed by Cole Bennett for Lyrical Lemonade and released in December 2018. It features Blueface walking around his neighborhood with his friends, with Hypebeast observing that Blueface is "stunting". The Fader summarized the video as "Blueface, his friends, and a mop all cut together with datamosh-y special effects".

Charts

Certifications

References

2018 songs
2019 singles
Blueface songs